A by-election was held for the Australian House of Representatives seat of Gwydir on 8 May 1937. This was triggered by the resignation of Country Party MP Aubrey Abbott to become Administrator of the Northern Territory.

The by-election was won by Labor candidate William Scully.

Results

References

1937 elections in Australia
New South Wales federal by-elections